Live Recordings may refer to:
 Bootleg recordings made without authorization
 Live Recordings 2004, an album by Keane
 Live Recordings (Majida El Rouni album)
 Soundboard recordings made from a direct connection to the live-sound reinforcement system

See also
 Live album